Hypotrachyna indica is a species of foliose lichen in the family Parmeliaceae. Found in India, it was described as new to science in 2011.

References

Lichens described in 2011
Lichen species
Lichens of India
indica
Taxa named by Ana Crespo
Taxa named by Pradeep Kumar Divakar
Taxa named by Helge Thorsten Lumbsch
Taxa named by Dalip Kumar Upreti